Esther van Veen (born 27 September 1990) is a Dutch racing cyclist, who currently rides for UCI Women's Continental Team .

References

External links
 

1990 births
Living people
Dutch female cyclists
People from Heemskerk
Cyclists from North Holland